Yantr is a pseudonymous graffiti artist from Delhi, India. Yantr is a Sanskrit word which literally means "machine".

Early life
The real identity of him is not known. Not much is known about his life. He was raised in Assam where his father owned a garage. He is an Indian artist and designer who introduced contemporary mural art as a street art in India. He is an alumnus of Department of Fine Arts, from The Maharaja Sayajirao University of Baroda. Before starting the street art movement he worked nearly 10 years as an art director in advertising industry where he worked on global and Indian brands. Yantr has started contemporary mural art movement from Delhi and spread it to all over India such as in Mumbai, Kochi, Himachal Pradesh and Pune.

Career
Yantr was introduced to street art in 2006 and started working in 2008–09. He has traveled across India to paints murals in various cities including Delhi, Guwahati, Pune, Mumbai. He stenciled  a man with notes at different places in Delhi overnight in 2011 to protest against black money. He created Parmanu Muskan, the Buddha wearing a mechanical mask, for creating awareness of environmental issues. He also created an art Heart exchange with Sé Cordeiro in Hauz Khas during 2014 street art festival. He painted a bleeding rhino near Assam Zoo to highlight illegal poaching of rhinos for its horns. He participated in St+Art Mumbai. At Kochi Muziris Biennale, he painted a mechanical giant whale. He also created massive bird by arranging fodder on ground near village in Delhi. During street art festival in 2014, he created a mural of large drone with an eye on the side of five story building in Shahpur Jat area of Delhi. He also participated in 18 Degrees Festival in October 2014 and painted murals in Shillong. During street art festival in Mumbai, Ranjit Dahiya and he partnered to paint India’s largest mural, depicting the father of Indian cinema, Dadasaheb Phalke. He also painted a simple wall with a window into a dream sequence which later featured in home and design trends magazine. In 2015, he created promotional wall arts for Cadbury Oreo biscuits in Delhi. In 2016, he painted India’s tallest mural, 115 feet high water tank, depicting the wildlife conservation named Mission Leopard, in National Capital Region Gurgaon (Now Gurugram). In September 2016, he painted India’s first ever fire station in Pune, depicting the courage and spirit of firemen.

Style
His style is influenced by his childhood experiences in his father's garage and work in field of arts. His works are amalgamation of machines, organic forms and art, sometimes called bio-mechanicals, with eclectic themes.

References

Unidentified people
Living people
Indian graffiti artists
Pseudonymous artists
Political artists
Artists from Delhi
Year of birth missing (living people)
Maharaja Sayajirao University of Baroda alumni